Andrea Merola (born 1988) is an Italian female canoeist who won three medals at senior level of the Wildwater Canoeing World Championships and European Wildwater Championships.

References

External links
 Andrea Merola at CUS Pavia

1988 births
Living people
Italian female canoeists
Canoeists of Marina Militare